Richard Didier (born 23 February 1961 in Chatou, France) is a French senior civil servant. He  served as the Administrator Superior of Wallis and Futuna for two years, from 2006 to 2008.

Didier was marked with tensions and succession struggles between several of Wallis and Futuna's royal families and clans following the death of Tomasi Kulimoetoke II in 2007.

Didier left Wallis and Futuna for metropolitan France in 2008. Didier was appointed the Prefect of the Haute-Loire (Upper Loire) department by the French Cabinet at a meeting on 28 July 2008. He was succeeded as Administrator Superior of Wallis and Futuna by Philippe Paolantoni.

He is currently Prefect without assignment.

Honours and decorations

National honours

Ministerial honours

Civilian medals

References

External links 
 World Statesman: Wallis and Futuna

1961 births
Administrator Superiors of Wallis and Futuna
French civil servants
Living people
High Commissioners of the Republic in French Polynesia